Zev Cooper Taublieb (born June 26, 1993) is an American soccer player who plays as a midfielder.

College and amateur
Taublieb played for the Cosmos West U18 Youth Academy prior to playing college soccer for the Valparaiso Crusaders between 2011 and 2014. During this period, he was invited to play with the youth program at Fulham for four consecutive years. In his final year as a Crusader, he was named an All-American by the  Jewish Sports Review.

Taublieb spent the 2014 season with Seattle Sounders FC U-23.

Club career
Taublieb joined Sacramento Republic FC prior to the start of the 2015 season as a trialist, ultimately signing his first professional contract with the team. He made his first competitive appearance for the Republic on April 11 in a 3–1 win over LA Galaxy II, coming on as a second half sub for midfielder Octavio Guzman. His first start came during the Republic’s next match on April 15 in a win against Whitecaps FC 2. On April 18, he scored his first goal for the Republic in a 3–0 win against Portland Timbers 2.

On December 12, 2018, Taublieb signed for Åtvidabergs FF in Sweden.

Taublieb returned to the United States on May 11, 2020, joining USL League One side Richmond Kickers. He made his club debut on August 8 against Forward Madison, but suffered a season-ending injury just seven minutes after coming on as a substitute. Taublieb took a position as an assistant coach with the Viterbo V-Hawks men's soccer program during his rehab, then re-signed with the Kickers ahead of the 2021 season. However, due to rehab setbacks, Taublieb did not appear in a game during the entire season. After undergoing a second rehab stint and training with the club throughout the summer, he officially re-signed for a third season with Richmond on September 2, 2022.

Career statistics

References

External links

 Valparaiso profile
 
 
 
 

1993 births
Living people
21st-century American Jews
Jewish footballers
Jewish American sportspeople
American soccer players
Soccer players from New York City
Association football midfielders
Valparaiso Crusaders men's soccer players
Des Moines Menace players
Seattle Sounders FC U-23 players
Sacramento Republic FC players
Wilmington Hammerheads FC players
Charlotte Independence players
Varbergs BoIS players
Åtvidabergs FF players
Richmond Kickers players
USL Championship players
USL League One players
USL League Two players
Superettan players
Ettan Fotboll players
American expatriate soccer players
Expatriate footballers in Sweden
American expatriate sportspeople in Sweden